Sello Maake kaNcube (born 12 March 1960) is a South African actor. He has worked in his native land as well as the United States, United Kingdom, Canada and Europe.

Early life
Maake kaNcube was born in Orlando, Soweto, South Africa. He later moved to Atteridgeville, Pretoria, where he grew up. He changed his surname to Maake kaNcube in honour of his stepfather and his biological father. He holds a master's degree in script writing from the University of Leeds.

Work

Theatre
He performed at the Royal Shakespeare Company and at London's West End. The plays he performed in include:
Othello, based on William Shakespeare's play, Othello
The Suit, based on Can Themba's short story, The Suit
Smallholding
Raisin in the Sun
The Good Woman of Sharkville
Guess Who's Coming for Dinner
Prophets in The Black Sky
The Lion King, based on the 1994 animated classic, The Lion King
Aaron
Titus Andronicus, based on Shakespeare's play, Titus Andronicus

Filmography
He has appeared in the following films:
2017 Madiba (miniseries) as Chief Albert Luthuli
2005 Othello: A South African Tale
1993 Djadje: Last Night I Fell Off a Horse
1993 Taxi to Soweto
1993 Bopha!
1992 The Good Fascist
1991 Wheels and Deals
1990 Dark City
1990 The Rutanga Tapes
1989 A Dry White Season

Television
In his native country, he is best known for his leading roles in the long running soap opera Generations as Archie Moroka and on the ETV soap opera Scandal! as a villainous character called Lucas "Daniel" Nyathi. He also starred as the flamboyant Kgosietsile in Mzansi Magic's telenovela, The Queen and as a corrupt politician in Mzansi Magic's Rockville.

He narrated a 2008 natural history documentary Africa's Outsiders about unusually pigmented (albino) wild animals, which was aired by Animal Planet.

Awards
2021 Honorary SOTIGUI Award
2002 FNB Vita Nomination for Best Ensemble Performance in Musical Theatre, Best Script of a New South African Play, Best Director and for Best Production, for Komeng
2001 FNB Vita Award for Best Performance in a Comedy by a Male for Call Us Crazy
2000/2001 Pan African Heritage Broadcast Achievement Award for Drama
1994 DALRO Award for Best Actor for The Suit

Current and Previous Board Advisory Roles
CURRENT:
Deputy Chairman, Naledi Theatre Awards
Soweto TV Board 
Gauteng Arts and Culture Adjudication Panel

Previous: 
Gauteng Film Commission
Board of Trustees- Moving into Dance Mophatong

Community Empowerment Projects
Sello Maake kaNcube Foundation

References

External links
 
 Sello Maake Ka-Ncube at TVSA

Living people
1960 births
South African male voice actors
South African activists
People from Soweto
People from Pretoria